The California Academy of Distinguished Neutrals is the Californian chapter of the National Academy of Distinguished Neutrals.

Membership is limited to California neutrals who have substantial experience in the resolution of commercial & civil disputes, and who have been recognized for their accomplishments through the Academy's peer-nomination and extensive attorney client review process.

, only 120 such attorneys have been recognized by the group, less than 5% of the state's neutrals.

References

External links

National Academy of Distinguished Neutrals

Dispute resolution
Law-related professional associations
Organizations based in California